Bonnevaux is the name or part of the name of several places in France:

Communes
 Bonnevaux, Doubs
 Bonnevaux, Gard
 Bonnevaux, Haute-Savoie
 Bonnevaux-le-Prieuré, in the Doubs department

Abbeys
 Bonnevaux Abbey (Isère), a former Cistercian abbey in the commune of Villeneuve-de-Marc
 Bonnevaux Abbey (Vienne), a former Cistercian abbey in the commune of Marçay, Vienne